Jasikovac is a village in the municipalities of Ugljevik (Republika Srpska) and Teočak, Bosnia and Herzegovina.

Demographics 
According to the 2013 census, its population was 1,058, with 119 living in the Ugljevik part, and 939 in the Teočak part.

References

Populated places in Teočak
Populated places in Ugljevik